Greatest Hits is a pop album from MC Hammer in 1996 which features his most successful singles from his first four albums. There are currently two versions/covers of his "Greatest Hits" album, the other titled The Hits in 2000. It contains tracks from his first four albums, no tracks from the albums The Funky Headhunter and Inside Out are included.

Track listing
 "U Can't Touch This" - 4:17
 "Too Legit to Quit" (featuring Saja) - 5:36
 "Turn This Mutha Out" - 4:43
 "Pray" - 5:13
 "Addams Groove" - 3:59
 "Do Not Pass Me By" (featuring Tramaine Williams, Trina Johnson & The Voices) - 5:30
 "Here Comes the Hammer" - 4:32
 "Have You Seen Her" - 4:42
 "Let's Get It Started" - 4:08
 "Gaining Momentum" (featuring Saja) - 5:40
 "Pump It Up (Here's the News)" - 4:34
 "They Put Me in the Mix" - 3:28

References 

1996 greatest hits albums
MC Hammer compilation albums
EMI Records compilation albums